Airabin Justin (born March 25, 1981) is a former professional American and Canadian football defensive back. He was signed as an undrafted free agent by the Baltimore Ravens in 2003. He played college football for the University of Utah and Northern Arizona Lumberjacks.

Justin has also been a member of the Hamilton Tiger-Cats, Saskatchewan Roughriders and Edmonton Eskimos of the Canadian Football League.

1981 births
Living people
American players of Canadian football
American football cornerbacks
Canadian football defensive backs
Northern Arizona Lumberjacks football players
Baltimore Ravens players
Hamilton Tiger-Cats players
Saskatchewan Roughriders players
Edmonton Elks players
Players of American football from Inglewood, California